The 1925–26 Toronto St. Patricks season was Toronto's ninth in the National Hockey League (NHL). The St. Pats slipped to sixth in the standings and missed the playoffs.

Offseason
The St. Patricks signed Gerry Munro formerly of the Montreal Maroons on defence.

Regular season

Final standings

Record vs. opponents

Schedule and results

Playoffs
The St. Pats didn't qualify for the playoffs.

Player statistics

Awards and records

Transactions

September 21, 1925: Signed Free Agent Peter Bellefeuille
October 23, 1925: Acquired Gerry Munro from the Montreal Maroons for cash
November 24, 1925: Signed Free Agent Alvin Fisher
December 31, 1925: Signed Free Agent Gordon Spence
January 7, 1926: Claimed Francis Cain off Waivers from the Montreal Maroons
January 12, 1926: Lost Toots Holway off Waivers to the Montreal Maroons
January 14, 1926: Acquired Norm Shay from the Boston Bruins for cash
April 16, 1926: Signed Free Agent Bill Carson

See also
1925–26 NHL season

References

Toronto St. Patricks seasons
Toronto
Toronto